Luis Dogliotti (21 June 1937 – 27 April 2017) was a Uruguayan footballer. He played in three matches for the Uruguay national football team in 1961. He was also part of Uruguay's squad for the 1959 South American Championship that took place in Ecuador.

References

External links
 

1937 births
2017 deaths
Uruguayan footballers
Uruguay international footballers
Place of birth missing
Association football goalkeepers
Liverpool F.C. (Montevideo) players
Club Nacional de Football players
Racing Club de Montevideo players